Here is a list of mergers in Miyazaki Prefecture, Japan since the Heisei era.

Mergers from April 1, 1999 to Present
On January 1, 2006 - the towns of Sadowara and Tano (both from Miyazaki District), and the town of Takaoka (from Higashimorokata District) were merged into the expanded city of Miyazaki.
On January 1, 2006 - the old city of Miyakonojō absorbed the towns of Takajō, Takazaki, Yamada and Yamanokuchi (al from Kitamorokata District) to create the new and expanded city of Miyakonojō.
On January 1, 2006 - the villages of Kitagō, Nangō and Saigō (all from Higashiusuki District) were merged to create the town of Misato.
On February 20, 2006 - the towns of Kitakata and Kitaura (both from Higashiusuki District) were merged into the expanded city of Nobeoka.
On February 25, 2006 - the town of Tōgō (from Higashiusuki District) was merged into the expanded city of Hyūga.
On March 20, 2006 - the village of Suki (from Nishimorokata District) was merged into the newer and more expanded city of Kobayashi.
On March 31, 2007 - the town of Kitagawa (from Higashiusuki District) was merged into the expanded city of Nobeoka.
On March 30, 2009 -  the old city of Nichinan absorbed the towns of Kitagō and Nangō (both from Minaminaka District) to create the new and expanded city of Nichinan. Minaminaka District was dissolved as a result of the merger.
On March 23, 2010 - the town of Kiyotake (from Miyazaki District) was merged into the expanded city of Miyazaki. Miyazaki District was dissolved as a result of the merger.
On March 23, 2010 - the town of Nojiri (from Nishimorokata District) was merged into the expanded city of Kobayashi.

Planned/Future Mergers

 
Miyazaki